Akbar Salubiro was a 25-year-old man who went missing on March 25, 2017, after setting off for harvest in a remote village on the western part of the island Sulawesi, Indonesia. Akbar's remains were found two days later inside the body of a reticulated python.

Disappearance and discovery of body 
The morning after Salubiro was reported missing, a search party was sent out, and his family became worried and called the police. Later that day, the snake that had eaten Salubiro slithered into Salubiro's backyard near an oil palm plantation. People saw that it had difficulty moving due to its large belly, an official stated. Residents then cut open the belly of the snake and found Salubiro dead inside. People said they heard cries from the palm grove the night before Salubiro was found eaten by the snake.

Aftermath 
The death of Akbar Salubiro was the first fully confirmed case of a reticulated python killing and consuming an adult human, as the process of retrieving the body from the python's stomach was documented by pictures and videos taken by witnesses.

Watiba 2018 & Jahrah 2022 
On June 14, 2018, a 54-year-old woman named Wa Tiba, also of Sulawesi was also eaten by a reticulated python that had slithered into her garden at her home., In 2022 a missing Sumatran Grandma from Jambi named Jahrah was found inside a Python making this the 3rd fully documented swallowing of a human

See also 
 List of largest snakes
 List of solved missing person cases
 Man-eaters

References 

2010s missing person cases
2017 in Indonesia
Deaths by person in Asia
Deaths due to snake attacks
Deaths in Indonesia
Formerly missing people
History of Indonesia
Missing person cases in Indonesia